A  mirrorless camera is a photo camera featuring a single, removable lens and a digital display.
The camera does not have a reflex mirror or optical viewfinder like a digital single-lens reflex (DSLR) camera, but may have an electronic viewfinder.
Many mirrorless cameras retain a mechanical shutter. Like a DSLR, a mirrorless camera accepts any of a series of interchangeable lenses compatible with its lens mount.

Terminology
Mirrorless cameras are sometimes referred to as mirrorless interchangeable-lens cameras (MILC), or digital single-lens mirrorless (DSLM) cameras. This latter name highlights their connection to DSLRs. Other terms include electronic viewfinder interchangeable lens (EVIL) cameras and compact system cameras (CSCs).

Overview
Mirrorless cameras are mechanically simpler than DSLR cameras, and are smaller, lighter, and quieter due to the elimination of the moving mirror.  While nearly all mirrorless cameras have a mechanical shutter, many also have an electronic shutter, allowing completely silent operation. 

Until the mid 2010s mirrorless cameras were somewhat challenged to provide an electronic viewfinder with the clarity and low-lag responsiveness of the optical viewfinders used on DSLRs, especially under strong sunlight or when photographing the sky at night.
As the image from the lens is always projected onto the image sensor, features can be available which are only possible in DSLRs when the mirror is locked up into "live view" mode. This includes the ability to show a focus-peaking display, zebra patterning, and face or eye tracking. The electronic viewfinder can provide live depth of field preview, can show a poorly-illuminated subject how it would look with correct exposure in real time, and makes it easier to view the results of an exposure in bright sunlight.

With the latest phase-detect autofocus available on some mirrorless cameras, the autofocus speed and accuracy of some models has been shown to be as good as DSLRs. But mirrorless cameras have shorter battery life than DSLRs due to prolonged use of LCD and/or OLED viewfinder displays, and often smaller buffers (to save battery). On-sensor autofocus is free of the adjustment requirements of the indirect focusing system of the DSLR (which relies on a separate autofocus sensor located below the reflex mirror), and as of 2018 mirrorless cameras could shoot with phase-detect autofocus at up to 20 frames per second using up to 693 focus points—a number far exceeding what was available on any DSLR. However, on-sensor phase detection autofocus (except for Canon's Dual Pixel Autofocus) repurposes pixel sites for autofocus acquisition, so that image data is partially or entirely missing for the autofocus "pixels", which can cause banding artifacts in the final image.

Sensor size
A full-frame camera is a digital camera with a digital sensor the same size as 35 mm format film. Cameras that have a smaller sensor than full-frame (such as APS-C and Micro Four Thirds) differ in having a crop factor. Digital cameras with a larger sensor than full-frame are called medium format, after medium format film cameras that use the 120 and 220 film formats.

Sony was the first to introduce a full-frame mirrorless camera, the α7, in 2013. It was followed by the Leica SL (Typ 601) in 2015.

Nikon and Canon each launched full-frame mirrorless  cameras in September 2018. Panasonic and Sigma, under the L-Mount Alliance, announced that they will be using the Leica L-Mount for their own full-frame mirrorless cameras. Panasonic announced its S1R and S1 cameras, and Sigma announced a then-unnamed camera, later called the fp, all to be launched in 2019 along with lenses from Panasonic and Sigma.

History 
In 2013, mirrorless system cameras constituted about five percent of total camera shipments. In 2015, they accounted for 26 percent of system camera sales outside of the Americas, and 16 percent within the United States.

2004–2006. The first digital rangefinder camera commercially marketed was the Epson R-D1 (released in 2004), followed by the Leica M8. They were some of the first digital lens-interchangeable cameras without a reflex mirror, but they are not mirrorless cameras because they did not use a digital display system for live preview. Compact cameras with large sensors, technically akin to the current mirrorless cameras, were also marketed in this period. Cameras like Sony Cyber-shot DSC-R1 and Sigma DP1 proved that live preview operation is possible, and useful with APS-C sized sensors.

2008. The first mirrorless camera commercially marketed was the Panasonic Lumix DMC-G1, released in Japan in October 2008. It was also the first camera of Micro Four Thirds system, developed exclusively for the mirrorless ILC system.

2009–2010. The Ricoh GXR (November 2009) had a radically different design. The mirrorless camera featured interchangeable lens units – a sealed unit of a lens and sensor, instead of the lens only being interchangeable. This design was different from other mirrorless cameras, and received mixed reviews, primarily due to its higher cost. 

Following the introduction of the Micro Four Thirds system, several other cameras were released by Panasonic and Olympus, with the Olympus PEN E-P1 (announced June 2009) being the first mirrorless camera in a compact size (pocketable with a small lens). The Samsung NX10 (announced January 2010) was the first camera in this class not using the Micro Four Thirds system, instead utilizing a new, proprietary lens mount (Samsung NX-mount). The Sony Alpha NEX-3 and NEX-5 (announced May 14, 2010, and released in July 2010) saw Sony enter the market with a new, proprietary lens mount (the Sony E-mount), though the camera included LA-EA1 and LA-EA2 adapters for the legacy Minolta A-mount.

2011. In June 2011, Pentax announced the 'Q' mirrorless interchangeable lens camera and the 'Q-mount' lens system. The original Q series featured a smaller 1/2.3 inch 12.4 megapixel CMOS sensor. The Q7, introduced in 2013, has a slightly larger 1/1.7 inch CMOS sensor with the same megapixel count.

In September 2011, Nikon announced their Nikon 1 system which consists of the Nikon 1 J1 and Nikon 1 V1 cameras and lenses. The V1 features an electronic viewfinder. The series includes high-speed mirrorless cameras which, according to Nikon, had the  fastest autofocus and the fastest continuous shooting speed (60 fps) of any camera with interchangeable lenses, including DSLRs.

2012. The Fujifilm X-Pro1, announced in January 2012, was the first non-rangefinder mirrorless with a built-in optical viewfinder. Its hybrid viewfinder overlaid electronic information, including shifting frame-lines, to compensate for the parallax effect. Its 2016 successor, the X-Pro2, had an updated version of this viewfinder.

Beyond just consumer interest, mirrorless lens systems created significant interest from camera manufacturers as a possible alternative to high-end camera manufacturing. Mirrorless cameras have fewer moving parts than DSLRs, and are more electronic, which is an advantage to electronic manufacturers (such as Panasonic, and Samsung), while reducing the advantage that dedicated camera manufacturers have in precision mechanical engineering. Sony's entry level full frame mirrorless α7 II camera has a 24-megapixel 5-axis stabilised sensor, but is more compact and less expensive than any full-frame sensor DSLR.

Canon was the last of the major manufacturer of DSLRs to announce their own mirrorless camera, announcing the Canon EOS M in 2012 with APS-C sensor and 18 mm registration distance similar to the one used by NEX.

In the longer term Olympus decided that mirrorless may replace DSLRs entirely in some categories; Olympus America's DSLR product manager speculated that by 2012 Olympus DSLRs (the Olympus E system) might be mirrorless, though still using the Four Thirds System (not Micro Four Thirds).

Panasonic UK's Lumix G product manager John Mitchell, speaking to the Press at the 2011 "Focus on Imaging" show in Birmingham, reported that Panasonic "G" camera market share was almost doubling each year, and that the UK Panasonic "G" captured over 11% of all interchangeable camera sales in the UK in 2010, and that the UK "CSC" sales made up 23% of the interchangeable lens market in the UK, and 40% in Japan.

In May 2010 the prices of interchangeable-lens camera ranged from US$550 to $800, a little higher than entry-level DSLRs and significantly more than high-end compact cameras.

Sony announced their 2011 sales statistics in September 2012, which showed that mirrorless lenses had 50% of the interchangeable lens market in Japan, 18% in Europe, and 23% worldwide. Since then, Nikon and others entered the mirrorless market.

2013. Due to the downward trend of the world camera market, mirrorless camera sales suffered, but not as drastically and was compensated with increase by about 12 percent in the Japanese mirrorless camera market. However, mirrorless cameras took longer to catch on in Europe and North America. According to Japanese photo industry sources, mirrorless made up only 11.2% of interchangeable-lens cameras shipped to Europe in the first nine months of 2013, and 10.5% of those shipped to the U.S. in the same period. An industry researcher found that mirrorless camera sales in the U.S. fell by about 20% in the three weeks leading up to December 14, 2013—which included the key Black Friday shopping week; in the same period, DSLR sales went up 1%.

2015. 2015 sales statistics showed that overall camera sales have fallen to one third of those of 2010, due to compact cameras being substituted by camera-capable mobile phones. Within camera sales, ILCs have seen their market share increasing, with ILCs being 30% of overall camera sales, of which DSLRs were 77% and mirrorless cameras were 23%. In the Americas in 2015, DSLR annual sales fell by 16% per annum, while mirrorless sales over the same 12-month period have increased by 17%. In Japan, mirrorless cameras outsold DSLRs during some parts of the year.  In 2015, mirrorless-cameras accounted for 26 percent of interchangeable-lens camera sales outside the Americas, although a lesser share of 26 percent was in the U.S.

2016. In late 2016, Olympus announced their OM-D E-M1 Mark II camera, a successor to the earlier and successful Mark I. The Mark II model retains a Micro Four Thirds image sensor of 17.3x13 mm and features a 20.4 megapixel resolution lens, representing a new generation of mirrorless cameras competitive with and in many respects superior to DSLR cameras.

2017. In early 2017, Sony announces the Alpha-9 mirrorless camera, offering 693 autofocus points, and 20 frame-per-second shooting. In October Sony announces the A7RIII, offering 10FPS shooting at 42 megapixels.

2018. In early 2018, Sony announced the A7III mirrorless camera, bringing the 693 autofocus points of the A9 at a much lower cost. In August, Nikon announced its new full-frame mirrorless Z 6 and Z 7 cameras, both using a new lens mount. Canon announced its first full-frame mirrorless model, the EOS R, and its own new lens mount the next month.

At the NAB Show in April 2018, Blackmagic Design announced and demonstrated the Pocket Cinema Camera 4K at a price of $1295 USD.

Systems comparison

References 

 

Japanese inventions
 

de:Systemkamera#Digitale Systemkameras